The Pittsburgh Condors were a professional basketball team in the original American Basketball Association (ABA). Originally called the Pittsburgh Pipers, they were a charter franchise of the ABA and captured the first league title. The team played their home games in Pittsburgh's Civic Arena.

Franchise history

Pittsburgh Pipers - First ABA Champions (1967–1968)

The Pipers were one of the ABA's inaugural franchises in 1967. The team had great success on the court, posting the league's best record during the regular season (54-24, .692) and winning the league's first ABA Championship. The Pipers were led by their star player, ABA MVP and future Hall-of-Famer Connie Hawkins, who led the ABA in scoring at 26.8 ppg. The Pipers swept through the 1968 ABA Playoffs and defeated the New Orleans Buccaneers 4 games to 3 to take the title, with Hawkins earning Finals MVP honors. The ABA title remains Pittsburgh's only pro basketball championship. Coupled with the Philadelphia 76ers' NBA championship one year earlier, Pennsylvania had two pro basketball champions in as many years.

Playoff Results

Division Semifinals
(1) Pittsburgh Pipers vs. (3) Indiana Pacers: Pipers win series 3-0
Game 1 @ Pittsburgh: Pittsburgh 146, Indiana 127
Game 2 @ Pittsburgh: Pittsburgh 121, Indiana 108
Game 3 @ Indiana: Pittsburgh 133, Indiana 114

Division Finals
(1) Pittsburgh Pipers vs. (2) Minnesota Muskies: Pipers win series 4-1
Game 1 @ Pittsburgh: Pittsburgh 125, Minnesota 117
Game 2 @ Pittsburgh: Minnesota 137, Pittsburgh 123
Game 3 @ Minnesota: Pittsburgh 107, Minnesota 99
Game 4 @ Minnesota: Pittsburgh 117, Minnesota 108
Game 5 @ Pittsburgh: Pittsburgh 114, Minnesota 105

ABA Finals
(1) Pittsburgh Pipers VS. (1) New Orleans Buccaneers: Pipers win Series 4-3
Game 1 @ Pittsburgh:  Pittsburgh 120, New Orleans 112
Game 2 @ Pittsburgh:  New Orleans 109, Pittsburgh 100
Game 3 @ New Orleans:  New Orleans 109, Pittsburgh 101
Game 4 @ New Orleans:  Pittsburgh 106, New Orleans 105
Game 5 @ Pittsburgh:  New Orleans 111, Pittsburgh 108
Game 6 @ New Orleans:  Pittsburgh 118, New Orleans 112
Game 7 @ Pittsburgh:  Pittsburgh 122, New Orleans 113

The Pipers shared the Pittsburgh Civic Arena with the city's expansion National Hockey League team, the Pittsburgh Penguins. The Pipers attracted fairly respectable gates by ABA standards, averaging 3,200 fans per game.

Minnesota Pipers (1968–1969)
Despite the championship and strong attendance figures in Pittsburgh, the Pipers franchise left Pittsburgh after their 1968 ABA Championship and moved to Minnesota on June 28, 1968, becoming the Minnesota Pipers. Minnesota was left vacant when the Minnesota Muskies had trouble drawing people in the league's first season and moved to Miami to become the Miami Floridians. The ABA league office was based in Minneapolis (home of league commissioner George Mikan), so the Pipers moved when a Minneapolis attorney named Bill Erickson bought a majority share of the team. As with the Muskies, their home arena was Bloomington's Met Center.  Despite making the playoffs (but losing in the first round to, coincidentally, the Miami Floridians), the Pipers' attendance settings fared no better than the Muskies and they moved back to Pittsburgh after only one season. In Terry Pluto's book on the ABA, Loose Balls, Pipers co-owner Gabe Rubin says he returned to the Steel City because he couldn't think of anywhere else to go.

Pittsburgh Pipers (1969–1970)
For the first season back in Pittsburgh the team retained the "Pipers" nickname. However, the team failed to match their previous success and fans stayed away. After the season, Haven Industries, maker of the "Jack Frost" brand of sugar products, bought the team and decided a name change was in order.

Pittsburgh Condors (1970–1972)

1970–71 season
A "name-the-team" contest yielded the nickname "Pittsburgh Pioneers." However, local NAIA school Point Park College (now Point Park University) already had that nickname and threatened to sue. Ownership resolved the objection by changing the name to "Condors."

Jack McMahon took over as coach. John Brisker and Mike Lewis played in the 1971 ABA All-Star Game, but the Condors could only manage a 36-48 record, fifth place in the Eastern Division and out of the playoffs (one game behind The Floridians). While the Condors had a potent offense (fifth in the 11-team ABA with 119.1 points per game), they were often undone by their defense (fourth-worst, allowing 121.8 ppg). Attendance remained poor, with an announced average of 2,806, though some observers close to the team thought the actual average was less than half that. After a slow (4-8) start, general manager Marty Blake decided (in an infamous ABA stunt) to give away every available seat for an early-season game against Florida on November 17. The game attracted the biggest crowd that the team would ever draw under the Condors name as 11,012 tickets were given out; however, only 8,074 (in a 12,300-seat arena) actually showed up. (3,000 season ticket holders didn't even bother to attend the contest, which Pittsburgh lost, 122-116.) Ownership was not amused, and Blake was fired soon after.

The most memorable moment of the season came when Charlie "Helicopter" Hentz destroyed two backboards in a game against the Carolina Cougars.

1971–72 season
For the next season, Haven tried to change the Condors' image, with a new logo and uniforms, plus a slick marketing campaign. In October, they lured the defending NBA champion Milwaukee Bucks (and star Lew Alcindor) to Pittsburgh for an exhibition game, guaranteeing the Bucks $25,000. A local ad proclaimed "Bring on Alcindor" and that "the ABA-NBA merger is here". (The merger would not actually happen until 1976, and it would not include Pittsburgh.) Unfortunately for the Condors, Alcindor—who had changed his name to Kareem Abdul-Jabbar just a few days before the game—was injured and did not play (the Bucks won anyway, 129-115). Only 8,881 fans showed up, and the Condors "took a bath" on the deal—not a good start for the season.

After a 4-6 start, general manager Mark Binstein fired McMahon for unknown reasons and named himself head coach. The move backfired disastrously; the Condors only went 21-50 the rest of the way.

As the season progressed, attendance dropped below 1,000 fans per game, fueling speculation the Condors would fold before Christmas. While they did manage to survive into the New Year, Haven had finally seen enough and announced the Condors would be playing elsewhere for the 1972-73 season. In the meantime, they began relocating home games, first to other cities in Pennsylvania, and then to farther-away places. On March 24, 1972 the Condors hosted the Kentucky Colonels in Birmingham, Alabama; four days later, the Condors hosted the Colonels again, this time in their last 'home' game, in Tucson, Arizona.

John Brisker and George Thompson played in the ABA All-Star Game. The Condors finished in sixth place in the Eastern Division at 25-59 and failed to make the playoffs. They averaged 2,215 fans per home game—a figure that would have been even lower if not for the gates brought in at both Birmingham (an estimated 3,000) and Tucson (reported as 5,000). These were significantly better than the ones in Pittsburgh; the Condors drew only 689 at their final game at the Civic Center.

Decline and folding
Haven and the league tried to move the Condors to a bigger market.  However, they were unable to do so, and on June 13, 1972 the ABA canceled the Condors franchise.  The Condors' roster was put into a dispersal draft; George Thompson went to the Memphis Tams, Mike Lewis to the Carolina Cougars, Skeeter Swift and James Silas to the Dallas Chaparrals, and Walt Szczerbiak to the Kentucky Colonels. John Brisker jumped to the Seattle SuperSonics of the NBA.

Basketball Hall of Famers

Notes:
 1 Inducted as a player. Never played for the franchise.

Season-by-season

|-
!colspan="6" style="background:#0047AB; color:#F87217; border:2px solid #F87217;"|Pittsburgh Pipers (ABA)
|-
|1967–68 ||54  ||24  ||.692 || Won Eastern Division SemifinalsWon Eastern Division FinalsWon ABA Finals||Pittsburgh Pipers 3, Indiana Pacers 0Pittsburgh Pipers 4, Minnesota Muskies 1Pittsburgh Pipers 4, New Orleans Buccaneers 3
|-
|colspan="6" align=center style="background:#0047AB; color:#F87217; border:2px solid #F87217;"| Minnesota Pipers
|-
|1968–69 ||36  ||42  ||.462 || Lost Division Semifinals || Miami Floridians 4, Minnesota Pipers 3
|-
|colspan="6" align=center style="background:#0047AB; color:#F87217; border:2px solid #F87217;"| Pittsburgh Pipers
|-
|1969–70 ||29  ||55  ||.345 || colspan=2|Did not qualify 
|-
|colspan="6" align=center style="background:#BF2F38; color:#ffd321;"| Pittsburgh Condors
|-
|1970–71 ||36 ||48  ||.429 || colspan=2 rowspan=2|Did not qualify 
|-
|1971–72 ||25 ||59 || .298 
|-

References

External links
 Condors page at Remember the ABA

 
American Basketball Association teams
Condors
Basketball teams established in 1970
Basketball teams disestablished in 1972
Defunct basketball teams in Pennsylvania
1967 establishments in Pennsylvania
1972 disestablishments in Pennsylvania
Defunct basketball teams in the United States